Murphy v. National Collegiate Athletic Association, No. 16-476, 584 U.S. ___ (2018), was a United States Supreme Court case involving the Tenth Amendment to the United States Constitution. The issue was whether the U.S. federal government has the right to control state lawmaking. The State of New Jersey, represented here by Governor Philip D. Murphy, sought to have the Professional and Amateur Sports Protection Act (PASPA) overturned, allowing state-sponsored sports betting. The case, formerly titled Christie v. National Collegiate Athletic Association until Governor Chris Christie left office, was combined with NJ Thoroughbred Horsemen v. NCAA No. 16-477.

The pro-betting side characterized the federal government's position as commandeering, declaring federal laws that the states would have the responsibility to enforce. The anti-betting side relied on the Supremacy Clause of the United States Constitution to keep PASPA in force.  The outcome of this case is likely to be cited in future cases involving the legalization of marijuana, where a similar state–federal question exists.

On May 14, 2018, the Court reversed lower court findings, favoring New Jersey in deciding that PASPA violated the anticommandeering principle by a 7–2 vote, and declared the entire law unconstitutional by a 6–3 vote.

Background
In 1992, Congress passed the Professional and Amateur Sports Protection Act (PASPA), 28 U.S.C. §§ 3701-3704, to prohibit state-sanctioned sports gambling; the law stated that states may not "sponsor, operate, advertise, promote, license, or authorize by law or compact" sports gambling. The law made exemptions for gambling in four states: Nevada, Delaware, Oregon, and Montana which had established legal sports gambling regulations in place. New Jersey had attempted to apply for the exemption but failed to act in 1991 before this exemption window closed, in part due to state-level political issues.

State Senators Raymond Lesniak and Stephen M. Sweeney led a lawsuit by the state to challenge the federal law, but it was rejected by the United States District Court in March 2011, stating that only Governor Chris Christie, through his attorney general's office, could file such a suit. At the time, Gov. Christie had been against pursuing any legislation as he believed it would be difficult to bypass the federal ban.

Referendum
New Jersey voters in 2011 voted overwhelmingly in a nonbinding referendum to create a state constitutional amendment that would permit sports gambling. The next year, the New Jersey Legislature enacted the Sports Wagering Act ("2012 Act"), allowing sports wagering at New Jersey casinos and racetracks. In August 2012, the NBA, NFL, NHL, MLB, and NCAA sued under PASPA to enjoin the New Jersey law; they were later joined by the United States Department of Justice; this case was colloquially known as Christie I. In court hearings, the state argued they were aware that the 2012 Act violated PASPA, but they contended that PASPA violated the Tenth Amendment's protection against anti-commandeering federal laws that stripped the power of the state to repeal their own sports gambling ban. In February 2013, Judge Michael A. Shipp of the United States District Court for the District of New Jersey rejected the state's argument, and ruled for the leagues, finding that there was "an undisputed direct link between legalized gambling and harm to the Leagues" and granting an injunction against New Jersey from enforcing the 2012 law. New Jersey appealed to the Third Circuit Court of Appeals, but the court, in a 2–1 split decision, upheld the District Court's ruling. The Third Circuit opinion noted the distinction between "affirmative authorizations" specifically prevented in PASPA, and the act of repealing the state's law. The opinion stated: "We do not read PASPA to prohibit New Jersey from repealing its ban on sports wagering." The Supreme Court of the United States refused to hear the case by June 2014.

Revision of the law
Based on the repealing language from the Third Circuit's decision on Christie I, New Jersey State Senator Raymond Lesniak revised the 2012 law with the approval of the Justice Department. The revised bill, instead of authorizing sports gambling, repealed portions of existing New Jersey laws from 1977 that had banned sports gambling, citing the Third Circuit's decision, effectively making sports gambling legal within certain establishments (for example, the bill did not allow for underage gambling, and preventing gambling on teams from New Jersey). While it passed the New Jersey Legislature, Gov. Christie vetoed it, believing it was an attempt to bypass the Third Circuit's ruling. However, in September 2014, Gov. Christie changed his mind, and supported the legislation's attempt to grant sports betting rights in the states; within five weeks, Lesniak's new legislation was signed into law. 

The five leagues sued the state again in November 2014, creating Christie II. Both the District Court and Third Circuit found in favor of the leagues, that New Jersey's revised law still violated the PASPA; in both Courts, the judges saw the act of repealing only portions of previous state laws equivalent to affirmative authorizations and thus still violated PASPA.  While the Third Circuit decision was still split, the author of the original decision dissented from the new ruling, leading the state to request an en banc hearing of the full Third Circuit. The full Circuit still favored the leagues, 9–3, in their August 2016 decision, stating that PAPSA does not commandeer the states because it "does not command states to take affirmative actions."

Supreme Court
Encouraged by the language in the dissenting opinions from the Third Circuit on Christie II, New Jersey petitioned for a writ of certiorari from the Supreme Court in October 2016. The state specifically asked the question "Does a federal statute that prohibits modification or repeal of state-law prohibitions on private conduct impermissibly commandeer the regulatory power of States?," citing New York v. United States, as precedent. The Court accepted to hear the case June 27, 2017.   The case was combined with NJ Thoroughbred Horsemen v. NCAA, a petition to the Supreme Court filed by the New Jersey Thoroughbred Horsemen's Association (NJTHA) who had joined the state in its case in the District and Third Circuit court. The NJTHA is the licensed permit for gambling at Monmouth Park Racetrack, and they argued that because of the lower courts' stance on PASPA from Christie II, the economic viability of the Racetrack was at a severe economic disadvantage without the legal authority to bet on horse races. While they filed their petition separately to reflect the commercial impact of the situation, their question to the Supreme Court was the same of whether PASPA commandeered power from the states.

During the case, Phil Murphy was elected Governor of New Jersey, and the case, initially filed as Christie v. National Collegiate Athletic Association, was renamed Murphy v. National Collegiate Athletic Association.

During the course of the 2016 presidential campaign, then-candidate Donald Trump expressed his support for legalized sports betting.  In May 2017, Trump appointee, acting Solicitor General Jeffrey B. Wall, said New Jersey did not have a case. The Court heard the combined docket oral arguments December 4, 2017.

Opinion of the Court
The Court announced judgment in favor of the governor on May 14, 2018, reversing the Third Circuit by a vote of 7–2. Justice Samuel Alito wrote the majority opinion, joined by Justices John Roberts, Anthony Kennedy, Clarence Thomas, Elena Kagan, and Neil Gorsuch, and in part by Justice Stephen Breyer. The majority opinion agreed that one specific clause of PASPA, 28 U.S.C. §§ 3701(1), did commandeer power from the states to regulate their own gambling industries, following New York v. United States, and thus was unconstitutional, reversing the Third Circuit decision. Alito wrote "Congress can regulate sports gambling directly, but if it elects not to do so, each state is free to act on its own. Our job is to interpret the law Congress has enacted and decide whether it is consistent with the Constitution. PASPA is not." Regarding the distinction between Congress preventing the states from taking an action versus Congress requiring the states to take an action, Alito wrote, "This distinction is empty. It was a matter of happenstance that the laws challenged in New York and Printz commanded "affirmative" action as opposed to imposing a prohibition. The basic principle—that Congress cannot issue direct orders to state legislatures—applies in either event."

The court rejected the respondents' argument that the anti-authorization provision was a valid preemption of state law under the Supremacy Clause of the U.S. Constitution. The Supremacy Clause, the court pointed out, "is not an independent grant of legislative power to Congress" but "[i]nstead, it simply provides a rule of decision." For a federal provision to validly preempt state law, "it must represent the exercise of a power conferred on Congress by the Constitution[,] pointing to the Supremacy Clause will not do", and "since the Constitution confers upon Congress the power to regulate individuals, not States, [the] provision at issue must be best read as one that regulates private actors."

The court then outlined the three types of preemption, illustrated with cases. In Mutual Pharmaceutical Co. v. Bartlett, an example of conflict preemption, federal law enacted under Congress' Commerce Clause authority prohibited generic drug manufacturers from changing the composition or labeling of drugs approved by the Federal Drug Administration, thus state tort law could not force or hold liable a generic drug manufacturer for adding additional information to the FDA-approved label. Express preemption "operates in essentially the same way, but this is often obscured by the language used by Congress in framing preemption provisions." The court illustrated express preemption with Morales v. Trans World Airlines concerning a provision of the Airline Deregulation Act that used language that seemed directed to the states and similar to the issue in Murphy: 

Field preemption, the third type of preemption, occurs when federal regulation of a "'field' of regulation [is] so comprehensive[] that it has left no room for supplementary state legislation." The court noted that even it used the same sort of abbreviated description as Congress has done in express preemption, such as involved in Morales, in a 2015 case where the court described field preemption: "Congress has forbidden the State to take action in the field that the federal statute pre-empts." However, "in substance, field preemption does not involve congressional commands to the States", but "like all other forms of preemption, it concerns a clash between a constitutional exercise of Congress's legislative power and conflicting state law." The court then explained why preemption was not applicable to the PASPA provision prohibiting states from authorizing sports betting:

A question posed by the majority opinion was over the current severability doctrine employed by the Supreme Court at the time of this decision. Under this doctrine, if the Court finds a portion of the law passed by Congress is deemed unconstitutional, they must review all other aspects of that law based on the intent of Congress to determine if some or all of the law must be deemed unconstitutional. Alito and the five other justices that joined his opinion, excluding Breyer, believed §§ 3701(1) was unseverable from the remaining language of PASPA, and declared the law unconstitutional.

Concurrences and dissent
In a concurrence, Justice Thomas affirmed that the use of the severability doctrine was the right course of action in this decision, but postulated that the Court should revisit this doctrine since it often requires hypothesizing the intent of Congress. Justice Breyer, in his own written opinion, disagreed with Alito's opinion related to severability, believing the rest of the law could remain. Justice Ruth Bader Ginsburg wrote the dissenting opinion, joined by Justice Sonia Sotomayor and in part by Breyer. Justice Ginsburg wrote that the decision to overturn all of PASPA was excessive, and based on the desire to legalize sports betting.

Subsequent developments
The oral arguments in the case were considered to have gone favorably towards New Jersey and against the leagues, and many commentators believed that the Court would find that PASPA was unconstitutional. In anticipation of the Court's ruling, several states have begun setting legislation in place to allow for legal sports gambling, contingent on the results of the Supreme Court case.  By June 5, 2018, Delaware became the first state outside of Nevada to legalize sports gambling in wake of the Supreme Court decision. The New Jersey legislature had prepared a bill legalizing sports gambling prior to the Supreme Court ruling, and upon the Court's decision, formally introduced the bill the same day; the bill had undergone several revisions, and had passed both houses and signed into law by Governor Murphy by June 11, 2018.

In some cases, the leagues have been involved in helping to establish the legislation to be favorable for them as well, should the Court find for New Jersey. The professional leagues, like the NFL, NBA, and NHL, have also indicated they would agree to federally-regulated sports gambling and preparing their teams, owners, and players for this possibility, though the NCAA, representing non-professional players, has been more vocal about such allowances unless gambling on college or amateur sports remain banned. The Supreme Court decision only impacts intrastate sports gambling schemes. Interstate sports gambling remains illegal under the Federal Wire Act.

With the Court finding in favor of New Jersey, observers believe its ruling will impact other current federal laws in place that could be considered to have commandeered power from the states and other challenges related to the Tenth Amendment, such as gun ownership rights, immigration enforcement (eg. penalizing sanctuary cities), and the legalization of marijuana under state law.

See also

 Tenth Amendment

References

https://www.supremecourt.gov/opinions/17pdf/16-476_dbfi.pdf

External links
 
 Case page at SCOTUSblog

United States Supreme Court cases
United States Supreme Court cases of the Roberts Court
United States Tenth Amendment case law
Legal history of New Jersey
United States gambling case law
Sports betting
2018 in United States case law
National Collegiate Athletic Association litigation